Zilliacus is a Finland-Swedish surname that may refer to

 Benedict Zilliacus (born 1921), Finnish journalist, author, scriptwriter and translator
 Bruno Zilliacus (1877–1926), Finnish athlete
 Jutta Zilliacus (born 1925), Finnish-born Estonian journalist, author and ex-member of parliament
 Konni Zilliacus (senior) (1855–1924), Finnish politician, author and independence activist
 Konni Zilliacus (1894–1967), Finnish-born British member of parliament
 Tobias Zilliacus (born 1971), Finnish actor
 Thomas Zilliacus (born 1955), Finnish businessman
 Linda Zilliacus (born 1977 as Linda Gyllenberg), Finnish actress